Party of Socialist Democracy may refer to:

Party of Socialist Democracy, a former name of the Socialists for Reform party in San Marino
Parti de la Democratie Socialiste, a political party in Quebec